Rafael Hugo Fernández Silva (born 10 May 1977) is a Spanish actor.

Early life
Silva was born in Madrid's San Blas district. He began working as an electrician but, with his mother's encouragement, soon decided to try to be an actor. He began training in the RESAD (Real Escuela Superior de Arte Dramatico, Spain's oldest school of theater), while continuing with his vocal and guitar studies. He also joined a band called INORDEM.

Career
In the late 1990s he had the opportunity to participate in the Spanish television program Crónicas marcianas, helping him obtain some recognition. He was then given a leading role hit television series Al salir de clase, based on the lives of Spanish high school students. In 2005, after having played a role in the unsuccessful Paco y Veva,  Hugo Silva was cast as Lucas Fernandez in on Los Hombres de Paco, a show that averages nearly 4 million viewers per episode. In 2007 played the protagonist Mateo of critically acclaimed El Hombre de Arena.

In 2016 he joined the cast of El ministerio del tiempo

Filmography

Stage credits 
Hibrit (1993)
Les liaisons dangereuses (1995)
Toni in Atraco a las tres" (2001–2002)
Claudio in Hamlet'' (2009)

Awards and nominations

References

External links
 

1977 births
Living people
Male actors from Madrid
Spanish male film actors
Spanish male stage actors
Spanish male television actors
21st-century Spanish male actors